Bahadale is a settlement on the Tana River in Rahole National Reserve in Kenya's Garissa County.

References 

Populated places in Coast Province
Garissa County